Club Cantera Base 1939 Canarias S.A.D., commonly known as CB Canarias and known as Lenovo Tenerife for sponsorship reasons, is a professional basketball team that is based in San Cristóbal de La Laguna, Tenerife, Spain. Domestically, the team plays in the top level league in Spain, the Liga ACB and in European-wide competitions, the team plays in FIBA's Basketball Champions League (BCL). Their home arena is the Santiago Martín.

Canarias became a prominent club on the national scene during the 2010s, after securing promotion to the Liga ACB in 2014. Under the FIBA system, Canarias won two BCL championships (in 2017 and 2023) as well as three FIBA Intercontinental Cups (2017, 2020, 2023).

History 
The team was founded in 1994, after the old CB Canarias club, that huge financial problems at that time, merged with other teams of the Spanish island of Tenerife, to create the new Tenerife Canarias club, which only played two seasons in the Liga EBA competition, at the time when that league was the second tier level of Spanish club basketball.

People who were in disagreement with that merger then created the new CB 1939 Canarias club, which inherited the colors and the logo of the club. In 2012, Iberostar Canarias was promoted to Spain's top-tier level Liga ACB competition, after the team won the championship of the LEB Oro. However, the club couldn't actually promote, due to the club's inability to fulfill the requirements needed to join the league that are requested by the league's organizer, the ACB. One month later, on 20 July 2012, CB 1939 Canarias finally achieved the league promotion, after Lucentum Alicante's vacated place in the league was granted to CB 1939 Canarias.

Alejandro Martínez, became the team's head coach in 2003, and he managed to lead the team to multiple league promotions, going up from the LEB Plata (Spanish third tier), to the top-tier level Liga ACB. He resigned from the team's head coaching position in 2015.

Golden era and international championships 

In the 2016–17 season, Canarias returned to the European scene after 28 years. On 29 March 2017, Canarias qualified for the 2017 Final Four of FIBA's Basketball Champions League (BCL), which happened 36 years after the club's first league promotion up to Spain's previous top level competition, the Liga Nacional, in 1981. The 2017 Champions League Final Four was played at Canaria's home arena, the Pabellón Insular Santiago Martín. Canarias won the BCL championship, after beating the Turkish Super League club Banvit in the Final. The championship marked the first major title in the club's history.

On 24 September 2017, Canarias participated in the 2017 FIBA Intercontinental Cup, as the defending champions of the Basketball Champions League. The club won the FIBA Intercontinental Cup title, after beating the defending champions of the FIBA Americas League, the Venezuelan club Guaros de Lara, by a score of 76–71. Three years later, Canarias also won the 2020 FIBA Intercontinental Cup title, after they defeated the defending champions of the Basketball Champions League, the Italian club Virtus Bologna, by a score of 80–72.

In March 2020, the club stopped the 2019–20 season due to the COVID-19 pandemic in Spain. The following season, the 2020–21 season, was the most successful season in the ACB in the team's history. After finishing third in the regular season, Canarias beat San Pablo Burgos before being eliminated in the semi-finals by Barcelona. In the 2021–22 season, Canarias won their second BCL championship after defeating fellow Spanish team Manresa in the final in Bilbao.

Sponsorship naming 
Partly due to sponsorship reasons, the team has been known by several names over the years:

Arena

CB Canarias 1939 plays its home games at the Pabellón Insular Santiago Martín arena, which is located in San Cristóbal de La Laguna, on the Spanish island of Tenerife. The arena was opened in 1999, and it has a seating capacity of 5,100 people for basketball games. CB Canarias 1939 has used Pabellón Insular Santiago Martín as its home arena, since 2010.

It has hosted major sporting events, such as the 2017 Basketball Champions League Final Four, the 2017 FIBA Intercontinental Cup, the 2018 FIBA Women's World Cup, and the 2020 FIBA Intercontinental Cup.

Players

Current roster

Depth chart

Head coaches 
Alejandro Martínez: 2003–2015
Txus Vidorreta: 2015–2017, 2018–present
Nenad Marković: 2017
Fotios Katsikaris: 2017–2018

Season by season

Honours and awards

Honours 
Toal titles: 9

National competitions 
LEB Oro

 Champions (1): 2011–12

Copa Príncipe de Asturias:
Champions (1): 2012
Trofeo Gobierno de Canarias
Champions (2): 2009, 2011

International competitions 
Basketball Champions League
Champions (2): 2016–17, 2021–22
Runners-up (1): 2018–19
FIBA Intercontinental Cup
Champions (3): 2017, 2020, 2023

Friendly competitions 
Las Palmas, Spain Invitational Game
2018

Individual awards 
Liga ACB MVP

 Giorgi Shermadini – 2021

All-Liga ACB First Team

 Giorgi Shermadini – 2020, 2021, 2022
 Marcelo Huertas – 2021, 2022

All-Liga ACB Second Team

 Marcelo Huertas – 2020
 Javier Beirán – 2019

LEB Oro MVP
Jakim Donaldson – 2009, 2010
Ricardo Guillén – 2011
All LEB Oro First Team
Ricardo Guillén – 2011

References

External links 
Iberostar Tenerife official website at CBCanarias.net 
Iberostar Tenerife at ChampionsLeague.Basketball
Iberostar Tenerife at Eurobasket.com
Iberostar Tenerife at ACB.com 
Iberostar Tenerife at ACB.com (archive) 

 
1939 establishments in Spain
Basketball teams established in 1939
Basketball teams in the Canary Islands
Former LEB Oro teams
Liga ACB teams
Basket
San Cristóbal de La Laguna